District 10 is an urban district (quận) of Ho Chi Minh City, the largest city in Vietnam.

As of 2017, the district had a population of 239,053 and an area of 5.7181 km², occupying 0.24% of the city's total land area. It is divided into 15 small subsets which are called wards (phường), numbered from Ward 1 to Ward 15.

Geographical location

District 10 borders Tân Bình District to the north, District 5 to the south, District 3 to the east, and District 11 to the west.

References

Districts of Ho Chi Minh City